agorum core is a free and open-source Enterprise Content Management system by agorum Software GmbH from Germany. One of the main features is the Document-Network-Share. With that the documents within the ECM are shown as a normal network share. So it is usable like any other fileserver, you can use any program, that is able to access a normal drive (office-programs, scan-programs and so on). From the users' view the benefit is, that everything is working like before.

agorum core is part of the Lisog open source stack initiative.

History 
The development of agorum core started in the year 2000. From there it has been redesigned several times to use the latest technologies. Till the end of 2007 the system had been distributed as proprietary software. In the beginning of  2008 the decision was made, to free most parts of the software under GPL.
Since the end of 2009 agorum core version 6.4.0 is available. In 2013 at the Stuttgart DMS Expo trade fair, agorum has been awarded the open source "Innovative Project Implementation of the year" in collaboration with Medneo .

Capabilities 
agorum core itself is a Java (EJB)-based Software and the server part runs on most common Linux and Windows systems. The Client needs no installation. To access the server many common protocols are supported, like  SMB, WebDAV, HTTP/HTTPs for the Webportal, IMAP/SMTP for email programs, RSS-Feeds for notifications. Optional there is a windows client software available, to integrate the ECM into the operating system.

The system also consists of many other open source components. The installation routine offers the choice to directly install MySQL (InnoDB) or PostgreSQL databases.
In the commercial version of 2009 there is a support for MS SQL.
The system is based on EJB technologie. JBoss is used as the EJB application server. Lucene is used as full text search engine. OpenOffice.org is used to extract the text for the search index. Jasper/iReport is used as an integrated reporting system. There is also an integrated Workflow component, based on jBPM from JBoss.

Features 
 Linking documents
 Folder based document structure
 Storing different object types (Documents, Mails, ...)
 Custom metadata/attributes
 Sets (stored searches)
 Automatic document history
 Server cycle bin
 Integrated backup
 Make documents unchangeable (several lock levels)
 Check-In/Check-Out
 Intelligent folders (performing automatic tasks on folders, like archiving, deleting, send to workflow)
 Email integration
 Integrated wiki
 Integrated forum
 TIF / PDF/A support
 Integrated OCR [additional module]
 Notifications
 Notes
 Converting documents into several formats (PDF, HTML, ...)
 Multilingual

Protocols/Interfaces 

 CIFS/SMB
 RSS-Feeds
 SOAP-WebServices
 FTP
 XML
 IMAP4
 SMTP
 HTTP/HTTPS (Webportal)
 WebDAV
 Windows-Client-Integration
 SSL-Encryption

Search 

 Phonetic search
 Wildcard search
 Fulltext search
 Attribut/metadata search
 numeric search
 Combination (Bool'sche)
 Textfilter
 Automatic indexing
 Email indexing, including attachments
 Path based search within fulltext index

Administration 

 ADS (Active-Directory) – synchronisation (additional module)
 LDAP – synchronisation (additional module)
 ACL system
 Users
 Groups
 Reports
 Centralized configuration database

Integration 

A major goal of the open-source strategy of agorum core is the integration of other open-source components. The following projects are supported by a plugin:

 Liferay Portal
 SugarCRM
 HeliumV ERP

References

External links 
 Website of agorum core
 Download area
 Support for agorum core

Free content management systems
Document management systems
Free software programmed in Java (programming language)
Free business software
Free email software
Free email server software
Linux companies